Late Danboyi Saleh Usman was a Muslim member of the Pan-African Parliament (PAP), the legislative body of the African Union, and a senator from Taraba State, northern Nigeria. His membership in the People's Democratic Party was purportedly revoked in 2005 by the then state administration, but this action was declared illegal by the National Excos of the party after severe criticism of same by other politicians.

See also
List of members of the Pan-African Parliament

References

Members of the Pan-African Parliament from Nigeria
Year of birth missing (living people)
Living people
Peoples Democratic Party members of the Senate (Nigeria)
People from Taraba State